John Currie (14 December 1839 – 25 September 1922) was a Scottish architect, prominent in the 19th and early 20th centuries. He designed several notable buildings in Scotland, including town halls, schools and churches. Several of his works are now listed buildings.

Early life
Currie was born on 14 December 1839, in Elie, Fife, to Thomas Currie and Helen Ovenstone. Currie's father was an architect and builder, and it is believed John was articled to his practice. From around 1862, he was understood to be in partnership with his father.

Career
Around 1862, Currie's father's business became Thomas Currie & Sons, presumably marking John's joining the company.

Currie was working independently around 1870, in a practice at 5 St Andrew Square in Edinburgh. It does not seem that the business had a long existence, for it appeared in the Post Office directory for 1870–71 only.

He returned to his hometown, Elie, and formed another independent practice, with his father as his main client.

Currie's son, Thomas William, went into practice (named J. & T. W. Currie) with him in late 1903 or early 1904.

Selected notable works
Elie Parish Church (1855) – now Category B listed
Elie Primary School (1858) – north block only; now Category C listed
Elie and Earlsferry Town Hall (1872) –  now Category B listed
Kellie Castle, Pittenweem (1878) – repairs; now Category B listed
Crail Tolbooth and Town Hall (1886) – alterations, including doorway; now Category A listed
Crail mercat cross (1887) – capital and finial added; – now Category B listed
Elie and Earlsferry Town Hall (1887)
Claremont, Elie (1897)
Elie Golf Club clubhouse (1907) – addition

Personal life
Currie was married to Grace Curror. She died on 19 December 1912, aged 57. They had three children: Thomas, Grace and Margaret.

Death
Currie died on 25 September 1922, aged 82. At the time of his death, he was living at his villa, Claremont (in Links Place, Elie), which he built in 1897. He is interred in the kirkyard of Elie Parish Church, one of his works.

References

1839 births
1922 deaths
19th-century Scottish architects
20th-century Scottish architects